Field hockey in England is usually referred to simply as "hockey" instead of field hockey, whereas other variants of hockey, such as ice hockey, are referred to by their full name.

The sport is often played on astroturf pitches and occasionally grass pitches, although this is becoming increasingly rare. The sport is played on an amateur basis.

See also
 Field hockey in Great Britain
 England Hockey
 England men's national field hockey team
 England women's national field hockey team

References